The Philippine Institute of Architects (PIA) is an architectural society in the Philippines and is the oldest architectural society in Asia. It is composed of noble men and women from the architectural profession of the Philippines. It was founded by renowned architects in 1933 whose ultimate endeavor is the professional development of architecture in the Philippines.

The PIA once served as the Philippine Section and founding member of the Union Internationale des Architectes, the International organization for architects from 1950 until 1991 until its membership was then passed on to the United Architects of the Philippines.

About

Objectives 
The objectives of the PIA since its foundation in 1933.
 To organize and unite in fellowship the architects in the Philippines.
 To promote through collaborative efforts the advancement of the artistic and practical impacts of the profession.
 To help in the advancement of design and construction by elevating the standards of architectural education, training, and professional practice.
 To assist in bringing architecture more dynamically and intimately to the life of the social man.
 To coordinate the profession of architecture with allied arts, science, trade, industry, and the civic enterprise of the community.
Hoping to find in the fulfillment of these aims- its modest contributions towards the making of a better and happier world to live in.

PIA March 
The PIA Hymn March was composed in 1953 by kundiman composer Josefino Celestino Cenizal and PIA president Jose Ma. Zaragoza. It was first heard during the 20th PIA Annual National Convention.

"Come now! Let's all be united for the progress of our native land, as brother architects we must not forget to enhance the progress of our land!"

Official seal 
The official seal of PIA was the original work of its founding president, Arch. Juan Felipe Nakpil, fpia. It features the following in it:
 Skull of a carabao. The Carabao being the symbol of Filipino hard work and dedication to professionalism.
 Bahay-kubo. The "Filipino" house that truly symbolizes the Filipino architecture.
 Mt. Mayon- The world-renowned volcano that the Philippines boasts for its perfect cone.

History

Academia de Ingeniera, Arquitectura y Agrimensura de Filipinas 
The Philippine Institute of Architects traces its origin to the Academia de Ingeniera, Arquitectura y Agrimensura de Filipinas. The first organization for Filipino Maestro de Obras during the early 1900. It was co- founded by Carlos Alejandro Barretto, et al. in 1903.

The last serving President of the organization is Tomas Arguelles.

Timeline 

 1921- Tomas Mapua, member, became the first registered architect with the Professional Regulation Commission license number 00001.
 1925- Tomas B. Mapua established the Mapúa Institute of Technology to train and to share to the Filipino artisans what he have learned from the Cornell University in the United States.

Philippine Architects Society 
A the turn of the century on 1933, during the American occupation, the Pensionado and the members of the AiAAF joined forces hand-in-hand to establish the first architectural professional organization in the Philippines, thus the founding of the Philippine Architects Society on January 19, 1933.

The organization's first president was Juan F. Nakpil, who was then only 32 years old. He was president from 1933- 1935 until he was replaced by Tomas Mapua in 1935.

Among the founding members of the organization were Carlos Alejandro Barretto, who gave the name of the organization; Juan F. Nakpil, president; Tomas Mapua, chief of the Bureau of Public Works; Tomas Arguelles, president of AiAAF; Juan M. Arellano, Pablo S. Antonio, and Andrés Luna de San Pedro, from the Bureau of Public Works. The society held its headquarters at the Nakpil Mansion in Dakota, Manila.

Timeline 
 In 1936, American architect William E. Parsons sat as adviser of the PAS.
 In 1941, Pablo Antonio assumed the presidency of the PAS during the first PAS Convention held at the old Club Filipino in Sta. Mesa, Manila. In the same year, the organization bestowed to Pres. Manuel L. Quezon its first Honorary Membership Award.
 In 1941, the PAS established the School of Design and Arts along Isaac Peral Street (now United Nations Avenue, Manila). The school was dedicated for the training and education of architects and artisan in the country. However, the school was shut down during World War II and was never reopened until then.
 During World War II, the PAS ceased its activities from 1942 to 1945.

Philippine Institute of Architects 
In 1945, the PAS was called for a noble cause to help rehabilitate the war-stricken country. The society once again resumed its activities and changed the name to the Philippine Institute of Architects and Planners (PIAP) then to the present Philippine Institute of Architects.

Timeline 
 1950- Republic Act 545, or known as the Architects' Law was passed. RA 545 was amended in 2004 and became the foundation of the current Architecture Act of 2004 or the Republic Act 9266.
 1952- The PIA was admitted to the Union de Internationale de Architectes, the international organization for architects. In the same year, the organization transferred and buried the remains of painter Juan Luna in San Agustin Church in Intramuros.
 1953- During the 20th PIA National Convention, the PIA MArch was first heard.
 1955- The organization prepared the master plan for the proposed National Capitol Complex in Quezon City, under the name PIA Collaborative.
 1960- The organization published the first Architect's Code. On the same year, it also helped in the restoration process of the world renowned painting, Spoliarium.
 1961- It released its first publication journal entitled, PIA Journal with Felipe Mendoza, fpia as editor. On the same year, PIA president L.V. Locsin, opened the Philippine exhibit of American architect Frank Lloyd Wright at the PhilAm Life Building in Manila.
 1963- The PIA Quezon City Section was created.
 1966- The PIA released the first Architect's National Code. The same year, the Architectural Center Club was founded by PIA members Carlos Arguelles, Gabriel Formoso, AJ Luz, Francisco Fajardo, Manuel Manosa and Luis Araneta.
 1970- The PIA drafted the provisions of Presidential Decree 1096, also known as the National Building Code of the Philippines to be signed by President of the Philippines Ferdinand E. Marcos.
 1971- The PIA celebrated its Golden Anniversary with the League of Philippine Architects and the Association of Philippine Government Architects. The organization launched the PIA Walk which became the basis of the Annual Alay Lakad. It also released its second publication journal entitled "Krokis".
 1975- The PIA was united with LPA and APGA to form the United Architects of the Philippines.
 1985- Arch. Imelda Cancio, FPIA became the first female president of the PIA.
 1990- The organization established its permanent headquarters in Citiland Tower 1.
 1991- The organization passed on to the United Architects of the Philippines its membership in the Union de Internationale de Architectes. In the same year, the first architect-ambassador, Jose Ma. Zaragoza was appointed as diplomat to Malta.
 1993- The PIA held its first convention in a luxury ship MV Mabuhay.
 1997- Arch. Rogelio Villarosa, Gold Medalist, designed the PIA Center.
 2002- The PIA released its first internet website under the domain www.piaarchitect.com
 2003- On its 70th Anniversary, the PIA inaugurated the PIA Library and Museum.
 2004- The PIA bestowed the "70 Distinguished Men of Service" in Intramuros; and the first formal partnership of PIA and UAP was the Architectural Archives Philippines, with its founding chairman Robert Benedict Hermoso, FUAP and Joel Rico, FPIA.
 2005- Together with Instituto Cervantes, they launched the rare exhibit of Spanish architect Antonio Gaudi at the Ayala Museum. The first National Artist Architectural Marker was unveiled at the CCP, with PIA as the project proponent. Later, 12 structures were installed with such historic marker.
 2006- The first calendar-book was published by PIA and Boysen Paints entitled Philippine Skycrapers. It was followed by National Artists for Architecture, Malacanang Palace of the People, and American Colonial Architecture in the Philippines.
 2008- The PIA held its first international convention in Singapore.
 2009- The first international publication of the PIA was the Ang Mundo Ni Maestro 11 Filipino Master Builders and pioneer architects.
 2012- The Philippine Institute of Architecture Students and Associates (PIASA) was established. The PIA co-founded the Philippine Council for the Architecture Profession (PCAP) with J. Paul Octaviano, FPIA, as the founding Vice Chairman of the council.
 2012- The first architectural exhibit was initiated by PIA and the National Museum of the Philippines called the Philippine Architectural Gallery and Built Heritage Resource Center

Distinguished members

Gold Medal of Merit Awardees 
The PIA Gold Medal of Merit is the first, the most prestigious, and the oldest architectural award in the country. It was designed by Adolfo Benavides in 1950 and created by El Oro engraving.

The organization started awarding merits to outstanding and renowned  men and women of the architectural profession who have either done, rendered, or contributed to the enrichment and professional development of architecture in the Philippines and for the economic, civic, and national growth of the country.

Below is the list of the distinguished 22 members of the PIA who have received the Gold Medal of Merit Award from 1958 to present (2014).
 Andres Luna de San Pedro
 Juan Felipe Nakpil
 Fernando Ocampo
 Tomas Mapua
 Juan Marcos Arellano
 Antonio Toledo
 Cesar Concio
 Jose Ma. Zaragoza
 Carlos Da Silva
 Leandro Locsin
 Carlos Domingo Arguelles
 Antonio Sindiong
 Carlos Santos Viola
 Maximo Vicente, Jr.
 Manuel Go, Sr.
 William V. Coscolluela
 Rogelio G. ViIlarosa
 Ramon Ma. Zaragoza
 Ramon S. Orlina, Jr.
 Jose Pedro C.  Recio
 Carmelo T. Casas
 Ernesto Antonino D. Nasol

Additional Gold Medal of Merits 

 National Artists for Painting Fernando Amorsolo and Guillermo Tolentino both received the first Gold Medal of Merit Award in Fine Arts in 1955.
 National Artist for Painting Carlos "Botong" Francisco, Gold Medal of Merit Award in Fine Arts in 1963.
 Architects Jose Pedro Recio and Carmelo Casas received the first Architectural Achievement Award in 1999.

Gawad Gintong Likha Award 
The Gawad Gintong Likha Award is a national award given only to "exemplary architects who has received all merits from the Office of the President, United Architects of the Philippines, and the Philippine Institute of Architects".

National Artist Leandro V. Locsin, FPIA, FUAP, is the only one has received the first Gawad Gintong Likha Award. It was posthumously awarded to him in 2006
 PIA Gold Medal of Merit Awardee
 UAP Likha Awardee
 National Artist for Architecture
 Professional Regulation Commission Architect of the Year Award
 Araw ng Maynila Awardee

Presidents 

Since its founding in 1933, the PIA have elected among its members and sections, 52 architects as president of the organization.
 Juan Felipe Nakpil
 Tomas B. Mapua
 Pablo S. Antonio
 Fernando H. Ocampo
 Juan Marcos Arellano
 Cesar M. Concio
 Andres O. Luna de San Pedro
 Gines F. Fivera
 Jose Ma. M. Zaragoza
 Carlos Da Silva
 Edmundo G. Lucero
 Francisco B. Fajardo
 Carlos D. Arguelles
 Otilio A. Arellano
 Antonio S. Sindiong
 Felipe M. Mendoza
 Leandro V. Locsin
 Antonio S. Dimalanta
 Jesus M. Bondoc
 Manuel T. Mañosa, Jr.
 Gabino A. De Leon
 Ariston F. Nakpil
 Adolfo B. Benavides
 Cesar V. Canchela
 Arturo M. Mañalac
 Nicasio A. De Venecia
 Carlos A. Santos Viola
 Paulino T. Lim
 Imelda N B. Cancio
 Macario B. Pagdanganan
 Faustino G. Ramos
 Jessie M. Kayanan
 Nepthaly S. Del Rosario
 Ernesto Antonino D. Nasol
 J Paul Q. Octaviano
 Delfin M. Viola III
 Rogelio G. Villarosa
 Manuel R. Go, Sr.
 Francisco G. Flameno
 Nicomedes R. Pagulayan
 Augusto C. Galang
 Remigio G. Abello
 Orlando C. Villarin
 Delfin C. Pantangco, Jr. 
 Angelito R. Antonio
 Manuel E. Icasas
 Benedict P. Loy
 Antonio L. Loveria
 Teresa V. Fresnido
 Arnel M. Colcol
 Isabelita L. Israel
 Josefina B. Alfonso

PIA sections 

Baguio-Benguet
Bohol
Bulacan
Greater Cavite
Greater Davao
Greater Matutum
Ilocos
Manila
Negros Occidental
Pampanga
Pangasinan
Pangasinan Lingayen
Rizal
Zamboanga

References

External links
 Philippine Institute of Architects, 70 years of History, 1933–2003, Adarna Publishing 2003; Authors: Joel Rico,Ernesto Zarate,Ramon Ma.Zaragoza
 Cultural Center of the Philippines Encyclopedia, Vol. III, Architecture
 Bluprint Magazine, 2012
 Zaragoza,Images of the Past, Ramaza Publishing 1993
 Philippine Commonwealth Directory of the Philippine, Cornejo, 1939
 Yearbook of the Philippine Island, Department of Commerce, 1924
 Quarterly Bulletin Bureau of Public Work, 1924–1930
 Philippine Arts and Architecture,  Monthly magazine, 1990

Architecture in the Philippines
Architecture-related professional associations
.
Organizations based in Metro Manila
Organizations established in 1933
1933 establishments in the Philippines